Smart Girl is a 1935 film directed by Aubrey Scotto and starring Ida Lupino.

Reception
The film made a profit of $88,511.

References

External links
Smart Girl at IMDb

1935 films
Films directed by Aubrey Scotto
1935 drama films
American drama films
Films produced by Walter Wanger
American black-and-white films
Paramount Pictures films
1930s American films